Ho Lek Pui is a village in Fo Tan, Sha Tin District, Hong Kong.

Administration
Ho Lek Pui is a recognized village under the New Territories Small House Policy.

History
At the time of the 1911 census, the population of Ho Lek Pui was 45. The number of males was 18.

See also
 Kau Yeuk (Sha Tin)

References

External links
 Delineation of area of existing village Ho Lek Pui (Sha Tin) for election of resident representative (2019 to 2022)

Villages in Sha Tin District, Hong Kong
Fo Tan